This is a list of the heads of state and heads of government of the Group of Seven nations at each G6, G7, G8 summit since the organisation's inception in 1975. The Group consists of the 6-7-8 largest industrialized democracies, Canada, France, Germany, Italy, Japan,the United Kingdom and the United States. The European Union is also a member since 1977, represented by the President of the European Commission and the President of the European Council, which before 2009 was the leader of the state holding the rotating Presidency of the Council of the European Union, also sometimes coinciding with a G7/8 nation, and is since 2009 a permanent position. The G7 holds an annual summit, which each nation's head of government attends.  Each year the heads of government take turns assuming the presidency, whose job it is to set the agenda for and host the annual summit.  The leader who has been in office the longest of the seven leaders is considered the Senior G7 leader; currently held by Prime Minister Justin Trudeau since December 2021.

While the current G7 consists of seven nations, it didn't always. The group was formed as the Group of Six, G6, including all of today's members minus Canada. Under the leadership of Prime Minister Pierre Trudeau, Canada joined in the second year of the group's existence, 1976, forming the Group of Seven, G7. Russia joined the Group of Eight, G8, in 1997, under the leadership of President Boris Yeltsin. Russia was suspended in March 2014 after the Russian annexation of Crimea, the group being thereafter again referred to as the Group of Seven.

List of Senior G7 Leaders

The following is a chronology of senior G7 leaders from the founding of the G6 (a precursor organization to the G8) to the present.

List of seniority of current G7 leaders

G7 tenure
The longest period anyone has been the senior G7 leader is the 7 years, 259 days of Chancellor of Germany Angela Merkel, who was Chancellor for sixteen years.
The shortest period any past G7 leader has been the senior G7 leader is the 42 days of Prime Minister of the United Kingdom Tony Blair in 2007.
Despite the fact that Japan was a founding member of the G6 (which later became the G7, and then the G8), no Japanese Prime Minister has ever become the Senior G7 Leader.
Except for Prime Minister of the United Kingdom Harold Wilson, the first person to be Senior G7 Leader, no past Senior G7 Leader has held office for less than eight years.
Silvio Berlusconi currently holds the record of G8 Summit hosting, having hosted it in Italy three times.

Notes

Leaders
G8
G8